Song Yangbiao is a Chinese journalist for The Time Weekly and supporter of Bo Xilai.

Biography
Song is a freelance journalist with the Chinese newspaper The Times Weekly and has contributed to other newspapers within China.

On August 5, 2013, Song was arrested and detained for pro-Bo Xilai and Anti-Xi Jinping comments made on his Weibo page

References

People's Republic of China journalists
Bo Xilai
Chinese activists
Living people
20th-century births
Year of birth missing (living people)